The men's 200 metres event at the 2007 European Athletics U23 Championships was held at the Gyulai István Atlétikai Stadion in Debrecen, Hungary between 13–14 July 2007.

Medalists

Results

Final
14 July
Wind: -1.9 m/s

Semifinals
14 July
Qualified: first 4 in each heat to the Final

Semifinal 1
Wind: -0.4 m/s

Semifinal 2
Wind: -0.2 m/s

Heats
13 July
Qualified: first 2 in each heat and 6 best to the Semifinals

Heat 1
Wind: -0.4 m/s

Heat 2
Wind: -0.9 m/s

Heat 3
Wind: -0.8 m/s

Heat 4
Wind: -1.2 m/s

Heat 5
Wind: -0.5 m/s

Participation
According to an unofficial count, 31 athletes from 20 countries participated in the event.

 (1)
 (1)
 (2)
 (1)
 (2)
 (1)
 (1)
 (2)
 (3)
 (1)
 (2)
 (1)
 (1)
 (3)
 (1)
 (1)
 (1)
 (1)
 (2)
 (3)

References

200 metres
200 metres at the European Athletics U23 Championships